Golakhvor (also Romanized as Golākhvor and Golākhūr; also known as Kūrah Khīl, Kūrehl, Kuriagil, and Kyuryagil’) is a village in Arzil Rural District, Kharvana District, Varzaqan County, East Azerbaijan Province, Iran. At the 2006 census, its population was 420, in 103 families.

References 

Towns and villages in Varzaqan County